Dragging Canoe (ᏥᏳ ᎦᏅᏏᏂ, pronounced Tsiyu Gansini,  – February 29, 1792) was a Cherokee red (or war) chief who led a band of Cherokee warriors who resisted colonists and United States settlers in the Upper South. During the American Revolution and afterward, Dragging Canoe's forces were sometimes joined by Upper Muskogee, Chickasaw, Shawnee, and Indians from other tribes, along with British Loyalists, and agents of France and Spain. The series of conflicts lasted more than a decade after the end of American Revolutionary War. 

During that time, Dragging Canoe became the preeminent war leader among the Indians of the southeast. He served as war chief, or skiagusta, of the group known as the Chickamauga Cherokee (or "Lower Cherokee"), from 1777 until his death in 1792.

Biography
Tsiyu Gansini was born about 1738. Dragging Canoe was the son of Attakullakulla (Tsalagi, or "Little Carpenetr")—a Nipissing head-man—and Nionne Ollie ("Tame Doe"). Many members of these two Native American groups then lived with the Cherokee and had adapted to Cherokee society. Attakullakulla, Dragging Canoe's father, was born to the Nipissing near Lake Superior. His mother had been born to the Natchez but was adopted as a daughter by Cherokee Chief Oconostota's wife.

Dragging Canoe's family lived with the Overhill Cherokee on the Little Tennessee River in what is now southeast Tennessee. He survived smallpox at a young age, which left his face marked.  Dragging Canoe's brother, The Badger, also became a Cherokee chief.

According to Cherokee legend, he was given his name because of an incident in his childhood. When he wanted to join a war party moving against the Shawnee, his father said that he could accompany the war party as long as he could carry his canoe. The youth tried to prove his readiness for war but could only drag the heavy canoe.

War chief of the Cherokee

Dragging Canoe had his first experience in actual combat during the Anglo-Cherokee War. In its aftermath, he was recognized as one of the strongest opponents to encroachment by white colonists onto Cherokee territories. Eventually, he became the headman of Mialoquo ("Great Island Town", "Amoyeli Egwa" in the Cherokee language) on the Little Tennessee River. When the Cherokee chose to ally with the British against the colonists at the onset of the Revolutionary War, Dragging Canoe was eager to fight and was assigned to be at the head of one of the major forces of the three-pronged attack against the Overmountain Settlements, that opened the war with the frontiersmen when they attacked Heaton's station in the Battle of Island Flats.  Dragging Canoe barely survived the battle.

Establishment of the Chickamauga towns
Following the colonial militias' counterattacks in late summer and fall 1776—which destroyed the Cherokee Middle, Valley, and Lower Towns in Tennesee and the Carolinas—his father and Oconostota sued for peace. Opposing his fathers counsel and refusing to admit defeat, Dragging Canoe led a band of about 500 Overhill Cherokee out of the towns, and they settled further south.  This ocurred in eary 1777. The group migrated along the Tennessee River to the area seven miles upstream from where the South Chickamauga Creek joins the Tennessee, in the vicinity of present-day Chattanooga. Thereafter, frontiersman referred to them as the "Chickamauga" because of their settlement by the creek. They established 11 towns, including one later referred to as "Old Chickamauga Town." This was across the river from the trading post of a Scotsman—who was the assistant superintendent of the British concerns in the region—John McDonald. McDonald regularly supplied the Chickamauga with guns, cannons, ammunition, and supplies to fight the American colonists.

In spring of 1779, American pioneer Evan Shelby led an expedition of frontiersmen from Virginia and North Carolina to destroy Dragging Canoe's Chickamauga towns. Shelby reported their success in a letter to Patrick Henry, saying "...[ the Chickamauga Cherokee ] are reduced to a Sense of their Duty and a Willingness to treat for peace with the united States..."

In 1782, for the second time since the wars' beginning, Cherokee towns were specifically attacked by a large United States force. The devastation caused by Colonel John Sevier's troop forced the band to move even further down the Tennessee River. Dragging Canoe established the "Five Lower Towns" below the natural obstructions of the Tennessee River Gorge.  These were: Running Water Town (now Whiteside), Nickajack Town (near the cave of the same name), Long Island (on the Tennessee River), Crow Town (at the mouth of Crow Creek), and Lookout Mountain Town (at the current site of Trenton, Georgia). Following this move, this band was alternatively referred to as the "Lower Cherokee."

From his base at Running Water Town, Dragging Canoe led attacks on white settlements all over the American Southeast, especially against American colonists on the Holston, Watauga, and Nolichucky rivers in eastern Tennessee.  After 1780, he also attacked settlements in the Cumberland River area, the Mero and Washington Districts, the Republic of Franklin, the Middle Tennessee areas, and raided into Kentucky and Virginia as well. His three brothers, Little Owl, the Badger, and Turtle-at-Home, often fought with his forces.

Death
Dragging Canoe died February 29, 1792, at Running Water Town, from exhaustion (or possibly a heart attack) after dancing all night celebrating the recent conclusion of an alliance with the Muskogee and the Choctaw.  The Chickamauga were also celebrating a recent victory by one of their war bands against the Cumberland settlements. He was succeeded as chief by John Watts.

Legacy
Historians such as John P. Brown in Old Frontiers, and James Mooney in his early ethnographic book, Myths of the Cherokee, consider him a role model for the younger Tecumseh, who was a member of a band of Shawnee living with the Chickamauga and taking part in their wars.  In Tell Them They Lie, a book written by a direct descendant of Sequoyah named Traveller Bird, both Tecumseh and Sequoyah are stated to have been among his young warriors.

See also
 Historic Cherokee settlements

Notes

References

Bibliography
Alderman, Pat. Dragging Canoe: Cherokee-Chickamauga War Chief, (Johnson City: Overmountain Press, 1978)
Brown, John P. Old Frontiers: The Story of the Cherokee Indians from Earliest Times to the Date of Their Removal to the West, 1838, (Kingsport: Southern Publishers, 1938).
Evans, E. Raymond.  "Notable Persons in Cherokee History: Dragging Canoe," Journal of Cherokee Studies, Vol. 2, No. 2, pp. 176–189. Cherokee: Museum of the Cherokee Indian,
Haywood, W.H. The Civil and Political History of the State of Tennessee from its Earliest Settlement up to the Year 1796, (Nashville: Methodist Episcopal Publishing House, 1891).
Klink, Karl, and James Talman, ed. The Journal of Major John Norton, (Toronto: Champlain Society, 1970).
McLoughlin, William G., Cherokee Renascence in the New Republic. (Princeton: Princeton University Press, 1992).
Mooney, James. Myths of the Cherokee and Sacred Formulas of the Cherokee. (Nashville: Charles and Randy Elder-Booksellers, 1982).
Moore, John Trotwood and Austin P. Foster. Tennessee, The Volunteer State, 1769–1923, Vol. 1. (Chicago: S. J. Clarke Publishing Co., 1923).
Ramsey, J. G. M., The Annals of Tennessee to the End of the Eighteenth Century, 1853 (2007 Online Edition). (Rockwood, TN: RoaneTNHistory.org, 2007).

Further reading
Brent Yanusdi Cox, Heart of the Eagle: Dragging Canoe & the Emergence of the Chickamauga Confederacy, 1999
Robert J. Conley's novel, Cherokee Dragon (Real People series), 2000

Chickamauga Cherokee
Native American people of the Indian Wars
Native Americans in the American Revolution
1730s births
1792 deaths
People of pre-statehood Tennessee